Amos Kloner (February 26, 1940 – March 16, 2019) was an Israeli archaeologist and professor emeritus.

Academic career
Amos Kloner taught in the Martin Szusz Department of the Land of Israel Studies at Bar Ilan University in Ramat Gan. His fields were Hellenistic, Roman and Byzantine archaeology.

Archaeology career
Kloner led the Israel Antiquities Authority's excavation of the Talpiot Tomb in 1980. In the 1990s, he was on the team that excavated the Byzantine site of Beit Guvrin.

Published works (English)

References

Israeli archaeologists
Academic staff of Bar-Ilan University
1940 births
2019 deaths